Mickey McBan (February 27, 1919 – October 30, 1979) was an American child actor. He was born in Spokane, Washington to British theatrical parents. McBan began his acting career at the age of four in Poor Men's Wives and specialized in portraying the everyday youngster in many films. In The Moving Picture Boy, John Holmstrom describes him as "mid-way between Jackie Cooper and John Howard Davies: mousier than the one, spunkier than the other, with an amused, reassuring expression." McBan never made the transition to portraying adults and his screen career was already over by 1929.

Partial filmography
 Poor Men's Wives (1923)
Daytime Wives (1923)
Not a Drum Was Heard (1924)
The Dawn of a Tomorrow (1924)
Untamed Youth (1924)
Hot Water (1924)
Peter Pan (1924)
The Splendid Road (1925)
The Splendid Crime (1926)
 Somebody's Mother (1926)
Beau Geste (1926)
Moonland (1926)
The Return of Peter Grimm (1926)
The Way of All Flesh (1927)
What Every Girl Should Know (1927)
Sorrell and Son (1927)
Father and Son (1929)

References

External links

1919 births
1979 deaths
American male child actors
American male film actors
American male silent film actors
Place of birth missing
Place of death missing
20th-century American male actors